Glenwood Golf Course is a par 35, nine-hole golf course in Glenwood, Iowa. Thomas Davis designed the course with bent grass greens and bluegrass fairways. From the front tees it is 2564 yards, 33.5 rating, and 120 slope, and from the back tees it is 2776 yards, 34.5 rating, and 123 slope, as provided by the USGA.

History

Another adjoining  were bought for $6,000.  $17,000 had already been raised by selling shares for $100 a share, so with $1,000 in the bank, they forged ahead. Tom Davis designed the nine-hole course, and with the help of many volunteers, many of whom belonged to the Glenwood Lions Club, the work began. Two dams were built to supply the water for the greens, the fairways were seeded (1963), and the members of the soon-to-be Ladies League for the course hand planted trees. Opening day was May 30, 1964. Dues the first year were $35.00, and if you belonged within a five-mile (8 km) radius of Glenwood, you could not play without being a member. The old farmhouse was used as a clubhouse. Later a new clubhouse was built at a cost of $185,000.

External links
Glenwood Golf Course at Golflink
GlenwoodNet.com
USGA official site

Golf clubs and courses in Iowa
Buildings and structures in Mills County, Iowa